Nicopolis or Nikopolis ("city of victory") was an inland town in the extreme east of ancient Cilicia, inhabited during Hellenistic, Roman, and Byzantine times. It was founded near the site of the Battle of Issus, and is mentioned by numerous ancient writers.

Its site is located near İslahiye in Asiatic Turkey.

References

Populated places in ancient Cilicia
Former populated places in Turkey
Roman towns and cities in Turkey
Populated places of the Byzantine Empire
History of Gaziantep Province
Catholic titular sees in Asia